The Maze Runner is a series of young adult dystopian science fiction novels written by American author James Dashner. The series consists of The Maze Runner (2009), The Scorch Trials (2010) and The Death Cure (2011), as well as two prequel novels, The Kill Order (2012) and The Fever Code (2016), a novella titled Crank Palace (2020), and a companion book titled The Maze Runner Files (2013). The sixth novel, titled The Maze Cutter, set 73 years following the events of The Death Cure, was released on October 4th, 2022.

The series, revealing details in non-chronological order, tells how the world was devastated by a series of massive solar flares and coronal mass ejections.

Novels

The Maze Runner

The Maze Runner is the first book in the series and was released on October 6, 2009.

A group of teenagers, who call themselves "Gladers", are left in a strange place which they call the "Glade". The Glade is surrounded by four doors, leading to the Maze, that close every night at sundown and open in the morning. Beyond the walls of the Glade is the ever-changing Maze, populated by horrifying, biomechanical creatures, called Grievers. Every month, a newcomer, nicknamed "Greenie",  joins the Gladers, sent by a lift they call the Box. Each newcomer has all past memories (except language and other common things) wiped out. The only thing that they remember is their name. They are watched by mechanical beetles, called 'beetle blades' which belong to their 'creators'. Each beetle blade has the word "WICKED" stamped across its back. The ultimate goal of the Gladers is to find a way out of the Maze. To do so, certain Gladers called "Runners" venture into the Maze every day, to map it in an attempt to find a pattern in the Maze that would lead them to find an exit. The main character, Thomas, arrives at the Glade. Shortly thereafter, a girl (Teresa) is sent up through the Box, arriving in a coma, and bringing the message: Everything is going to change. She bears a note saying "She's the last one. Ever." Thomas becomes an object of reverence, suspicion, and great curiosity to the Gladers due to his ties to all of the strange happenings in the Glade, fueled greatly after he becomes the first to survive a night inside the Maze. Together with new friends, such as Chuck (the second-newest newbie), Newt (second in command of the Gladers), and Minho (Keeper of the Runners), he begins to solve the mystery of the Maze and search for a way out. Thomas leads his group to make it out of the maze and find a way back home and defeat WICKED.

The Scorch Trials

The Scorch Trials is the second book released in the series, on September 18, 2010.

The Gladers thought that getting through The Maze was it. They were wrong. The Maze was only the beginning, and now WICKED demands they undergo the Scorch Trials, in which they must cross The Scorch——a barren wasteland left burned and scarred by violent sun flares. What's worse, the denizens of The Scorch are being consumed by an infection known as The Flare, corrupting their very minds until they lose all that makes them human. The game is set again, and WICKED controls the board, but if the Gladers want another chance at freedom, they must play WICKED's game and survive The Scorch Trials.

The Death Cure

The Death Cure is the third book released in the series, on October 11, 2011.

In the third book of "The Maze Runner" Series, Thomas is locked up in solitary confinement for four weeks. When he is released, and Assistant Director Janson (Rat Man) reveals to him and the other subjects (including Group B) that there is no cure for the Flare, but that most of the Gladers and Group B are immune. He warns them that many people in the outside world hate them because of their unnatural resistance to the Flare, and that if they escape they will most likely be in more danger. Later, all Gladers and Group B members' memories are restored and they escape. Thomas, Newt, and Minho refuse restoration and they later escape with Jorge and Brenda. They then go to a city and have WICKED's devices in their brains disabled. They join forces with "Right Arm", an organization fighting against WICKED. The moral may be that cooperation and working as a team is the most important factor.

The Kill Order

The Kill Order is the fourth book released in the series, on August 14, 2012. It is the first novel in narrative order, set prior to the events of The Fever Code and 13 years before the events in The Maze Runner. It is followed in narrative order by The Fever Code.

Of the novel, Dashner stated that he wanted to expand the world, but not focus on the main characters of the main Maze Runner trilogy. He also stated that he had originally planned to write a prequel for the series, but that the plans did not become official until he had completed the third book in the trilogy.

Before WICKED is formed, before the Glade is built, and before Thomas enters the Maze, solar flares hit the earth and mankind was ravaged by disease. Mark and Trina were there when it happened, and survived. Now a disease of rage and lunacy races across the eastern United States, and there's something suspicious about its origin and it's mutating, and all evidence suggests that it will bring humanity to its knees. Mark and Trina are convinced there's a way to save those left living from descending into madness.

The Fever Code

The Fever Code is the fifth book released in the series, on September 27, 2016. It is the second prequel and the fifth installment of The Maze Runner series. It is the second book in narrative order, preceded by The Kill Order and followed by The Maze Runner.

The book is set in between the events of The Kill Order and immediately before The Maze Runner. The novel is written from the various points of view of "The Gladers". The book primarily focuses on the training that Thomas and the others undergo before being sent into the Maze, however, it also explores the relationships between the Gladers before they underwent "the Swipe" that suppressed their memories, describes "the Purge" that is briefly mentioned in The Death Cure, and the lives of the Gladers before Thomas' insertion into the Maze, since during the events in the book he is working for WICKED. This book gives a background of the series, providing the reader with information they have been asking themselves. The book ends with the final moments before Thomas enters the Box, when he is betrayed and sent into the Maze at the beginning of The Maze Runner.

The Maze Cutter series

The Maze Cutter
The Maze Cutter is the first book of a spin-off trilogy to The Maze Runner series. It was published on October 4, 2022. It takes place 73 years after we the end of The Death Cure. It is centered around the descendants of the Gladers.

Other releases

The Maze Runner Files
The Maze Runner Files is a companion book to The Maze Runner series. It was released on 1 January 2013 as an e-book. It is 50 pages long. The book is divided into three parts: Confidential Files, Recovered Correspondence, and Suppressed Memories.

It contains information about the Flare, WICKED and some of the Gladers. It also reveals events such as Thomas and Teresa's first conversation, Minho's Phase Three Trial, Frypan's past, e-mails between WICKED correspondents, and more.

Crank Palace 
Crank Palace is a novella, released on August 25, 2020. The story is centered on the character Newt and takes place during the events of The Death Cure. It was first released as an audiobook on August 25, 2020, while the print copy and ebook version was released on November 23 of the same year.

Characters

Critical reception
Book retailer Barnes & Noble included The Maze Runner book as part of its showcasing of new writers for the end of 2009 and the beginning of 2010. Kirkus Reviews wrote, "Hard to put down, this is clearly just a first installment, and it will leave readers dying to find out what comes next".

Jessica Harrison of the Deseret Morning News labeled The Maze Runner as "a thrilling adventurous book for kids ages 13+ that will get readers' hearts pumping and leave them asking for more." She noted that it "starts out a bit slow" but as it matched Thomas's confusion and picked up pace as he became more accustomed, she wrote that "it's almost as if Dashner is easing the reader into what becomes a fast-paced, nonstop action." However, she thought the "only drawback" was the "fictionalized slang" that although it "feels realistic and fits with his characters, it gets old pretty fast. On the plus side, however, it's used so often that the reader almost becomes desensitized and learns to ignore it.

Film adaptations

The Maze Runner: Development for the film began in January 2011 when 20th Century Fox purchased the film rights to Dashner's novel series. Principal photography began in Baton Rouge, Louisiana in May 2013 and ended in July. It was released on September 19, 2014 to positive reviews.
Maze Runner: The Scorch Trials: Principal photography commenced in Albuquerque, New Mexico in October 2014 and ended in January 2015. It was released on September 18, 2015, this time to mixed reviews.
Maze Runner: The Death Cure: Principal photography began in South Africa in March 2017 and was released on January 26, 2018, again to mixed reviews.

References

Book series introduced in 2009
Science fiction novel trilogies
American science fiction novels
Dystopian novels
 book